Cladonia trassii is a species of fruticose lichen in the family Cladoniaceae. It has a circumpolar distribution and is found in arctic/alpine and subarctic habitats.

Taxonomy

Cladonia trassii was formally described as a new species in 1998 by Finnish lichenologist Teuvo Ahti. In a revision of the arctic lichen Cladonia stricta, he divided it into three distinct species based on morphological and chemical differences between them; Cladonia trassii was one of the new species, in addition to Cladonia uliginosa and C. stricta. The species epithet trassii honours Estonian lichenologist Hans Trass.

Ahti notes that the taxon is a new name for a species that Edvard Vainio originally called Cladonia cerasphora in 1894 and 1922 publications.

Description

The ascospores are spindle-shaped (fusiform) and measure 12–14 by 2.5–3 um.

The lichen product that occur in Cladonia trassii are atranorin and fumarprotocetraric acid as major metabolites, and minor amounts of protocetraric acid and confumarprotocetraric acid. The expected results of standard chemical spot tests are PD+ (red), and K+ (yellow).

Habitat and distribution

Cladonia trassii is found in arctic/alpine and subarctic habitats. It has a circumpolar distribution in the northern hemisphere. Documented collection locations include Khabarovsk Krai, Russian Far East; Alaska, United States; Northwest Territories and Québec, Canada; and Greenland.

See also
List of Cladonia species

References

trassii
Lichens described in 1998
Lichens of Canada
Lichens of Europe
Lichens of Subarctic America
Lichens of the Arctic
Lichens of the United States
Taxa named by Teuvo Ahti